Montana State University Billings (or MSU Billings) is a public university in Billings, Montana. It is the state's third largest university. Its campus is located on 110 acres in downtown Billings.  Formerly Eastern Montana Normal School at its founding in 1927, the Normal School changed its name to Eastern Montana College of Education in 1949. It was again renamed in 1965 as Eastern Montana College (EMC). It merged into the Montana University System in 1994 under its present name. Currently, the university offers over 100 specialized programs for certificates, associate, bachelor's, and master's degrees through the university's five colleges. The five colleges of Montana State University Billings are Liberal Arts & Social Sciences, Business, Health Professions and Science, Education, and City College.

Student life

With the main campus in the downtown core of Billings many cultural, service, athletic or educational activities are within walking distance of the campus. The school is host to a mix of traditional and nontraditional students. Approximately 400 students live on campus in the residence halls.

Some of the major student organizations include:

 The Associated Students of Montana State University Billings, also known as the student government.  This organization is run by and for students, taking in concerns, advocating student issues and rights, and allocating funds.
 Student Activities Board, the organizers of many activities from comedians to current movies on campus.
 Student religious organizations including United Campus Ministry representing 7 Protestant denominations, other Christian non-denominational organizations, Baha'i, and Catholic groups.
 Jacket Student Ambassadors, a student leadership organization on campus which hosts many new student orientations and tours of the campus.
 The Residence Hall Association, a student run residence hall association that provides both social and educational programming for residents of Petro and Rimrock Hall.

Major structures of the main campus
 McDonald Hall		
 Parking Garage / Campus Police
 Art Annex
 Apsaruke Hall
 Cisel Hall
 Alterowitz Arena / Physical Ed Building
 Avitus Group Stadium
 Tennis Courts
 Rimrock Hall
 Petro Hall
 McMullen Hall
 Student Union
 Library
 Liberal Arts Building
 Science Building
 College of Education

Petro Hall
Petro Hall is a 500-room residence hall completed in 1965. There are 8 floors, including the first floor Petro Theater and the second floor lobby. It is connected directly to the Petro Theater on the first floor, and also connected to the Student Union Building.

Rimrock Hall
Rimrock Hall is 300-room residence hall completed in 1962. There are 6 floors, including the second floor lobby and the first floor Student Union Building.

Student family housing
The student family housing consists of contemporary two and three bedroom units located on the east end of the campus.

Athletics

The Montana State–Billings (MSUB) athletic teams are called the Yellowjackets. The university is a member of the NCAA Division II ranks, primarily competing in the Great Northwest Athletic Conference (GNAC) since the 2007–08 academic year. The Yellowjackets previously competed in the D-II Heartland Conference from 2005–06 to 2006–07; in the D-II Pacific West Conference (PacWest; formerly known as the Great Northwest Conference until after the 1991–92 school year) from 1982–83 to 2004–05; as an NCAA D-II Independent from 1980–81 to 1981–82; and in the Frontier Conference of the National Association of Intercollegiate Athletics (NAIA) from 1933–34 to 1979–80.

MSUB competes in 16 intercollegiate varsity sports: Men's sports include baseball, basketball, cross country, golf, soccer and track & field; while women's sports include basketball, cross country, golf, soccer, softball, track & field, triathlon and volleyball; and co-ed sports include cheerleading and stunt. The official MSUB song is the Fight Song. Former sports included football.

History
Formerly known as Eastern Montana College, MSUB athletics started back to the 1927–28 school year, the year in which the university was founded. The Yellowjackets have competed in a number of different conferences throughout the years, and prior to the 1980–81 season, the athletic department transitioned from the NAIA to competing at the NCAA Division II level.

Baseball
In the 2018–19 school year, the MSUB baseball team captured its fourth GNAC regular-season title in five years, won its first-ever GNAC tournament title, and advanced to the NCAA D2 West Region Championships for the first time in program history. MSUB broke numerous school and conference baseball records, including most wins in a season with 33, and most home runs in a year with 83. The baseball program captured four regular season GNAC championships over a span of five years (2015, 2016, 2018, 2019).

Women’s basketball
The 2017–18 academic year was historic and was highlighted by an NCAA Division II Elite Eight appearance in women's basketball. The Yellowjackets won the West Region title for the second time in program history, matching the achievement of the 1998–99 regional champion squad. The women's team has been GNAC champions ten times since 1987.

Softball
The Yellowjackets won the 2015 GNAC Softball Championships and advanced all the way to the semifinals of the NCAA Division II West Region Championships. The team were also GNAC champions in 2009 and 2012.

Extensions

City College at Montana State University Billings
City College at MSU Billings is a two-year college that offers degrees and certifications in fields such as business, computer technology, health and safety, industry and transportation. It was first created in 1969 as the Billings Vocational-Technical Education Center (BVTC). Its governance was passed from the Billings School District to the Montana University System (MUS) Board of Regents in 1987, and in 1994, the BVTC was officially merged with MSU Billings and renamed the College of Technology. The name was changed to the present name in 2012 when the MUS Board of Regents voted to change the names of all the colleges of technology in the state.

Distance learning
MSUB Online is Montana State University Billings' Online Portal, featuring a wide array of courses and complete programs of study including certificates and associate degrees, bachelor's degrees, and master's degrees.

Notable alumni
James F. Battin (Class of 1948), US Representative and federal judge
Chet Blaylock (Class of 1948), State Senator, delegate to Montana constitutional convention, Montana gubernatorial candidate
Jeff Cysewski (Class of 1984), founder and CEO of SupportMed Inc.
Melony G. Griffith (Class of 1985), former member of the Maryland House of Delegates, member of the Maryland State Senate
Kristin Korb (Class of 1992), American jazz double bassist and vocalist
Dustin Lind, director of hitting and assistant hitting coach for the San Francisco Giants
Monica Lindeen (Class of 1992), Montana House District 43, US Congress candidate '06, former Montana State Auditor
 Judy Martz, 22nd Governor of Montana
Roy McPipe (Class of 1974), Drafted by the NBA in '73 and '74, played with the ABA's Utah Stars in 1975
Chris Nelson (Class of 1985), Founder and CEO of Zoot Enterprises
Deb Prevost (Class of 1980), played in the WBL from 1978 to 1980 with the Minnesota Fillies and Milwaukee Does
Kevin Red Star (Native American artist)
Becky Reno (Class of 1977), founder and president/CEO of City Brew Coffee
Jon Sonju (Class of 1997), former Montana state senator and representative
Bently Spang (Class of 1991), Northern Cheyenne multidisciplinary artist
Carl Ueland (Class of 1970) former president and partial owner of Actagro, LLC
Susan Watters (Class of 1980), United States District Judge of the US District Court for the District of Montana, first female judge to serve in the District of Montana
Angie Wong (Class of 1989), founder of Wong Global Leadership

See also
 List of college athletic programs in Montana

References

External links
 
 Official athletics website

 
Buildings and structures in Billings, Montana
Education in Yellowstone County, Montana
Educational institutions established in 1927
Montana State University System
Universities and colleges accredited by the Northwest Commission on Colleges and Universities
Tourist attractions in Billings, Montana
1927 establishments in Montana
Public universities and colleges in Montana